The 2014 season was Atlético de Kolkata's inaugural season in existence in the Indian Super League. They ended their first season as the champions of the inaugural edition of the competition.

Background
In early 2014 it was announced that the All India Football Federation, the national federation for football in India, and IMG-Reliance would be accepting bids for ownership of eight of nine selected cities for the upcoming Indian Super League, an eight-team franchise league modeled along the lines of the Indian Premier League cricket tournament. On 13 April 2014, it was announced that Sourav Ganguly, Harshavardhan Neotia, Sanjiv Goenka, Utsav Parekh, and Spanish La Liga side Atlético Madrid had won the bidding for the Kolkata franchise. Shahrukh Khan also submitted bids for the franchise but lost out The Kolkata franchise turned out to be the most expensive franchise, being purchased for 18 crore.

On 7 May 2014, during an official launch, it was announced that the name of the team would be Atlético de Kolkata. Indian Super League (ISL) Opening Ceremony Match will started with Atlético de Kolkata vs Mumbai City FC which will be the first match.

Signings
The first ever signing by the team was made on 3 July 2014, when former Real Madrid midfielder Borja Fernández was signed. He is also the first ever player signing in league history. Then, five days later, on 8 July 2014 it was confirmed that former Liverpool midfielder, Luis García, as their marquee for the 2014 season as well as the signing of Botswana international Ofentse Nato. The club then signed 14 Indian players between 22 July and 23 July during the 2014 ISL Inaugural Domestic Draft. This was followed by 6 foreigners from the Foreign Player Draft.

Atlético de Kolkata then began the month of August by signing Ethiopia international Fikru Teferra. and Spanish Goalkeeper Basilio Sancho Agudo.

In September Atlético signed Bangladesh captain Mamunul Islam.

Foreign signings

Drafted domestic players

Drafted foreign players

Players

Player squad

Technical staff

As of October 2014.

Pre-season and friendlies

Atlético de Kolkata trained in Spain in Los Angeles de San Rafael under manager Antonio Lopez Habas.

Competitions

Indian Super League

League table

Results summary

Results by round

Matches

Player statistics

Statistics

Goals

This includes all competitive matches. The list is sorted by shirt number when total goals are equal.

Discipline

See also
 Atlético Madrid
 2014 Indian Super League season
 2014-15 Atlético Madrid season

References

Atlético de Kolkata
ATK (football club) seasons